Ayuba Machem (born 14 February 1973) is a Nigerian sprinter. He competed in the men's 4 × 400 metres relay at the 1996 Summer Olympics.

References

1973 births
Living people
Athletes (track and field) at the 1996 Summer Olympics
Nigerian male sprinters
Olympic athletes of Nigeria
Place of birth missing (living people)
20th-century Nigerian people